Malakoff–Rue Étienne Dolet is a surface station on line Line 13 of the Paris Métro in the commune of Malakoff.

The station opened on 9 November 1976 as part of the extension of line 13 from Porte de Vanves and Châtillon–Montrouge. It is named after Malakoff and the street of Rue Étienne Dolet, named after Etienne Dolet (1509–1546). He was a printer, humanist and author of Remarks on the Latin language and poetry. He published Clément Marot and François Rabelais. He was convicted of heresy and was strangled and burned in Paris.

Station layout

Gallery

References
Roland, Gérard (2003). Stations de métro. D’Abbesses à Wagram. Éditions Bonneton.

Paris Métro stations in Malakoff
Railway stations in France opened in 1976
Articles containing video clips